The region of Macedonia is known to have been inhabited since Paleolithic times.

Еarliest historical inhabitants
The earliest historical inhabitants of the region were the Pelasgians, the Bryges and the Thracians. The Pelasgians occupied Emathia and the Bryges occupied northern Epirus, as well as Macedonia, mainly west of the Axios River and parts of Mygdonia. Thracians, in early times occupied mainly the eastern parts of Macedonia, (Mygdonia, Crestonia, Bisaltia). The Ancient Macedonians are missing from early historical accounts because they had been living in the southern extremities of the region – the Orestian highlands – since before the Dark Ages. The Macedonian tribes subsequently moved down from Orestis in the upper Haliacmon due to pressure from the Orestae.

Ancient Macedonians 

The name of the region of Macedonia (Makedonia) derives from the tribal name of the ancient Macedonians (Makedónes). According to the Greek historian Herodotus, the Makednoi were a Dorian tribe that stayed behind during the great southward migration of the Dorian Greeks.The word "Makednos" is cognate with the Doric Greek word "Μάκος" Μakos (Attic form Μήκος – "mékos"), which is Greek for "length". The ancient Macedonians took this name either because they were physically tall, or because they settled in the mountains. The latter definition would translate "Macedonian" as "Highlander".

The Macedonians (Makedónes) were an ancient tribe that lived on the alluvial plain around the rivers Haliacmon and lower Axios in the northeastern part of mainland Greece. Essentially an ancient Greek people, they gradually expanded from their homeland along the Haliacmon valley on the northern edge of the Greek world, absorbing or driving out neighbouring non-Greek tribes, primarily Thracian and Illyrian. They spoke Ancient Macedonian, which was either a sibling language to Ancient Greek or a Doric Greek dialect, although the prestige language of the region was at first Attic and then Koine Greek. Their religious beliefs mirrored those of other Greeks, following the main deities of the Greek pantheon, although the Macedonians continued Archaic burial practices that had ceased in other parts of Greece after the 6th century BC. Aside from the monarchy, the core of Macedonian society was its nobility. Similar to the aristocracy of neighboring Thessaly, their wealth was largely built on herding horses and cattle.

Although composed of various clans, the kingdom of Macedonia, established around the 8th century BC, is mostly associated with the Argead dynasty and the tribe named after it. The dynasty was allegedly founded by Perdiccas I, descendant of the legendary Temenus of Argos, while the region of Macedon perhaps derived its name from Makedon, a figure of Greek mythology. Traditionally ruled by independent families, the Macedonians seem to have accepted Argead rule by the time of Alexander I. Under Philip II, the Macedonians are credited with numerous military innovations, which enlarged their territory and increased their control over other areas extending into Thrace. This consolidation of territory allowed for the exploits of Alexander the Great, the conquest of the Achaemenid Empire, the establishment of the diadochi successor states, and the inauguration of the Hellenistic period in West Asia, Greece, and the broader Mediterranean world. The Macedonians were eventually conquered by the Roman Republic, which dismantled the Macedonian monarchy at the end of the Third Macedonian War (171–168 BC) and established the Roman province of Macedonia after the Fourth Macedonian War (150–148 BC).

Before the reign of Alexander I, father of Perdiccas II, the ancient Macedonians lived mostly on lands adjacent to the Haliakmon, in the far south of the modern Greek province of Macedonia. Alexander is credited with having added to Macedonia many of the lands that would become part of the core Macedonian territory: Pieria, Bottiaia, Mygdonia, and Eordaia (Thuc. 2.99). Anthemus, Crestonia, and Bisaltia also seem to have been added during his reign (Thuc. 2.99). Most of these lands were previously inhabited by Thracian tribes, and Thucydides records how the Thracians were pushed to the mountains when the Macedonians acquired their lands.

Generations after Alexander, Philip II of Macedon would add new lands to Macedonia, and also reduce neighboring powers such as the Illyrians and Paeonians, who had attacked him when he became king, to semi-autonomous peoples. In Philip's time, Macedonians expanded and settled in many of the new adjoining territories, and Thrace up to the Nestus was colonized by Macedonian settlers. Strabo however testifies that the bulk of the population inhabiting in Upper Macedonia remained of Thraco-Illyrian stock. Philip's son, Alexander the Great, extended Macedonian power over key Greek city-states, and his campaigns, both local and abroad, would make the Macedonian power supreme from Greece, to Persia, Egypt, and the edge of India.

Following this period there were repeated barbaric invasions of the Balkans by Celts.

Roman Macedonia 

After the defeat of Andriscus in 148 BC, Macedonia officially became a province of the Roman Republic in 146 BC. Hellenization of the non-Greek population was not yet complete in 146 BC, and many of the Thracian and Illyrian tribes had preserved their languages. It is also possible that the ancient Macedonian tongue was still spoken, alongside Koine, the common Greek language of the Hellenistic era. From an early period, the Roman province of Macedonia included Epirus, Thessaly, parts of Thrace and Illyria, thus making the region of Macedonia permanently lose any connection with its ancient borders, and now be the home of a greater variety of inhabitants.

Byzantine Macedonia 

As the Greek state of Byzantium gradually emerged as a successor state to the Roman Empire, Macedonia became one of its most important provinces as it was close to the Empire's capital (Constantinople) and included its second largest city (Thessaloniki). According to Byzantine maps that were recorded by Ernest Honigmann, by the 6th century AD there were two provinces carrying the name "Macedonia" in the Empire's borders:
Macedonia Prima ("First Macedonia")
  encompassing most of the kingdom of Macedonia, coinciding with most of the modern Greek region of Macedonia, and had Thessalonica as its capital.
Macedonia Salutaris ("Wholesome Macedonia"), also known as Macedonia Secunda ("Second Macedonia")
 partially encompassing both Pelagonia and Dardania and containing the whole of Paeonia. The province mostly coincides with the present-day North Macedonia. The town of Stobi located to the junction of the Crna Reka and Vardar rivers, the former capital of Paeonia, became the provincial capital.

Macedonia was ravaged several times in the 4th and the 5th century by desolating onslaughts of Visigoths, Huns and Vandals. These did little to change its ethnic composition (the region being almost completely populated by Greeks or Hellenized people by that time) but left much of the region depopulated.

Later in about 800 AD, a new province of the Byzantine Empire – Macedonia, was organised by Empress Irene out of the Theme of Thrace. It had no relation with the historical or geographical region of Macedonia, but instead it was centered in Thrace, including the area from Adrianople (the theme's capital) and the Evros valley eastward along the Sea of Marmara. It did not include any part of ancient Macedon, which (insofar as the Byzantines controlled it) was in the Theme of Thessalonica.

Middle Ages

Taking advantage of the desolation left by the nomadic tribes, Slavs settled in the Balkan Peninsula from the 6th century AD
(see also: South Slavs). Aided by the Avars and by Turkic Bulgars, Slavic tribes in the 6th century started a gradual invasion into the lands of Byzantium. They infiltrated into Macedonia and reached as far south as Thessaly and the Peloponnese, settling in isolated regions that the Byzantines called Sclavinias, until they were gradually pacified. Many Slavs came to serve as soldiers in Byzantine armies and settled in other parts of the Byzantine Empire. Slavic settlers assimilated many among the Romanised and Hellenised Paeonian, Illyrian and Thracian population of Macedonia, but pockets of tribes that fled to the mountains remained independent. A number of scholars today consider that present-day Aromanians (Vlachs), Sarakatsani and Albanians originate from these mountainous populations. The interaction between Romanised and non-Romanised indigenous peoples and the Slavs resulted in linguistic similarities which are reflected in modern Bulgarian, Albanian, Romanian and Macedonian, all of them members of the Balkan language area. The Slavs also occupied the hinterland of Thessaloniki, launching consecutive attacks on the city in 584, 586, 609, 620, and 622 AD, but never taking it. Detachments of Avars often joined the Slavs in their onslaughts, but the Avars did not form any lasting settlements in the region. A branch of the Bulgars led by khan Kuber, however, settled in western Macedonia and eastern Albania around 680 AD and also engaged in attacks on Byzantium together with the Slavs. By this time, several different ethnicities inhabited the whole Macedonia region, with South Slavs forming the overall majority in the northern fringes of Macedonia while Greeks dominated the highlands of western Macedonia, the central plains, and the coastline.

At the beginning of the 9th century, Bulgaria conquered the Northern Byzantine lands, including Macedonia B and part of Macedonia A. Those regions remained under Bulgarian rule for two centuries, until the destruction of Bulgaria by the Byzantine Emperor Basil II (nicknamed "the Bulgar-slayer") in 1018.
In the 11th and the 12th centuries, the first historical mention occurs of two ethnic groups just off the borders of Macedonia: the Arvanites in modern Albania and the Vlachs (Aromanians) in Thessaly and Pindus. Modern historians are divided as to whether the Albanians came to the area then (from Dacia or Moesia) or originated from the native non-Romanized Thracian or Illyrian populations.

Also in the 11th century Byzantium settled several tens of thousands of Turkic Christians from Asia Minor, referred to as Vardariotes, along the lower course of the Vardar. Colonies of other Turkic tribes such as Uzes, Petchenegs, and Cumans were also introduced at various periods from the 11th to the 13th century. All these were eventually Hellenized or Bulgarized. Romani, migrating from north India, reached the Balkans - including Macedonia - around the 14th century, with some of them settling there. Successive waves of Romani immigration occurred in the 15th and the 16th century, too. (See also: Roma in the Republic of Macedonia)

In the 13th and the 14th centuries the Byzantine Empire, the Despotate of Epirus, the rulers of Thessaly, and the Bulgarian Empire contested for control of the region of  Macedonia, but the frequent shift of borders did not result in any major population changes. In 1338 the Serbian Empire conquered the area, but after the Battle of Maritsa in 1371 most of the Serbian lords of Macedonia acknowledged Ottoman suzerainty. After the conquest of Skopje by the Ottoman Turks in 1392, most of Macedonia formally became incorporated into the Ottoman Empire.

Ottoman rule

Muslims and Christians 

The initial period of Ottoman rule led a depopulation of the plains and river valleys of Macedonia. The Christian population there fled to the mountains. Ottomans were largely brought from Asia Minor and settled parts of the region. Towns destroyed in Vardar Macedonia during the conquest were renewed, this time populated exclusively by Muslims. The Ottoman element in Macedonia was especially strong in the 17th and the 18th century with travellers defining the majority of the population, especially the urban one, as Muslim. The Ottoman population, however, sharply declined at the end of the 18th and the beginning of the 19th century on account of the incessant wars led by the Ottoman Empire, the low birth rate and the higher death toll of the frequent plague epidemics among Muslims than among Christians.

The Ottoman–Habsburg War (1683–1699), the subsequent flight of a substantial part of the Serbian population in Kosovo to Austria and the reprisals and looting during the Ottoman counteroffensive led to an influx of Albanian Muslims into Kosovo, northern and northwestern Macedonia. Being in the position of power, the Albanian Muslims managed to push out their Christian neighbours and conquered additional territories in the 18th and the 19th centuries. Pressures from central government following the first Russo-Turkish war that ended in 1774 and in which Ottoman Greeks were implicated as a "fifth column" led to the superficial Islamization of several thousand Greek-speakers in western Macedonia. These Greek Muslims retained their Greek language and identity, remained Crypto-Christians, and were subsequently called Vallahades by local Greek Orthodox Christians because apparently the only Turkish-Arabic they ever bothered to learn was how to say "wa-llahi" or "by Allah". The destruction and abandoning of the Christian Aromanian city of Moscopole and other important Aromanian settlements in the southern Albania (Epirus-Macedonia) region in the second half of the 18th century caused a large-scale migration of thousands of Aromanians to the cities and villages of Western Macedonia, most notably to Bitola, Krushevo and surrounding regions. Thessaloniki also became the home of a large Jewish population following Spain's expulsions of Jews after 1492. The Jews later formed small colonies in other Macedonian cities, most notably Bitola and Serres.

Hellenic idea 

The rise of European nationalism in the 18th century led to the expansion of the Hellenic idea in Macedonia. Its main pillar throughout the centuries of Ottoman rule had been the indigenous Greek population of historical Macedonia. Under the influence of the Greek schools and the Patriarchate of Constantinople, however, it started to spread among the other orthodox subjects of the Empire as the urban Christian population of Slavic and Albanian origin started to view itself increasingly as Greek. The Greek language became a symbol of civilization and a basic means of communication between non-Muslims. The process of Hellenization was additionally reinforced after the abolition of the Bulgarian Archbishopric of Ohrid in 1767. Though with a predominantly Greek clergy, the Archbishopric did not yield to the direct order of Constantinople and had autonomy in many vital domains. However, the poverty of the Christian peasantry and the lack of proper schooling in villages preserved the linguistic diversity of the Macedonian countryside. The Hellenic idea reached its peak during the Greek War of Independence (1821–1829) which received the active support of the Greek Macedonian population as part of their struggle for the resurrection of Greek statehood. According to the Istituto Geografiko de Agostini of Rome, in 1903 in the vilayets of Selanik and Monastir Greek was the dominant language of instruction in the region:

The independence of the Greek kingdom, however, dealt a nearly fatal blow to the Hellenic idea in Macedonia. The flight of the Macedonian intelligentsia to independent Greece and the mass closures of Greek schools by the Ottoman authorities weakened the Hellenic presence in the region for a century ahead, until the incorporation of historical Macedonia into Greece following the Balkan Wars in 1913.

Bulgarian idea 

Most of the population of Macedonia was described as Bulgarians during 16th and 17th centuries by Ottoman historians and travellers such as Hoca Sadeddin Efendi, Mustafa Selaniki, Hadji Khalfa and Evliya Çelebi. The name meant, however, rather little in view of the political oppression by the Ottomans and the religious and cultural one by the Greek clergy. The Bulgarian language was preserved as a cultural medium only in a handful of monasteries, and to rise in terms of social status for the ordinary Bulgarian usually meant undergoing a process of Hellenisation. The Slavonic liturgy was, however, preserved at the lower levels of the Bulgarian Archbishopric of Ohrid for several centuries until its abolition in 1767.

The creator of modern Bulgarian historiography, Petar Bogdan Bakshev in his first work "Description of the Bulgarian Kingdom" in 1640, mentioned the geographical and ethnic borders of Bulgaria and Bulgarian people including also "the greather part of Macedonia ... as far as Ohrid, up to the boundaries of Albania and Greece ...". Hristofor Zhefarovich, a Macedonia-born 18th-century painter, had a crucial influence on the Bulgarian National Revival and significantly affected the entire Bulgarian heraldry of the 19th century, when it became most influential among all generations of Bulgarian enlighteners and revolutionaries and shaped the idea for a modern Bulgarian national symbol. In his testament, he explicitly noted that his relatives were "of Bulgarian nationality" and from Dojran.
Although the first literary work in Modern Bulgarian, History of Slav-Bulgarians was written by a Macedonia born Bulgarian monk, Paisius of Hilendar as early as 1762, it took almost a century for the Bulgarian idea to regain ascendancy in the region. The Bulgarian advance in Macedonia in the 19th century was aided by the numerical superiority of the Bulgarians after the decrease in the Turkish population, as well as by their improved economic status. The Bulgarians of Macedonia took active part in the struggle for independent Bulgarian Patriarchate and Bulgarian schools.

The representatives of the intelligentsia wrote in a language which they called Bulgarian and strove for a more even representation of the local Bulgarian dialects spoken in Macedonia in formal Bulgarian. The autonomous Bulgarian Exarchate established in 1870 included northwestern Macedonia. After the overwhelming vote of the districts of Ohrid and Skopje, it grew to include the whole of present-day Vardar and Pirin Macedonia in 1874. This process of Bulgarian national revival in Macedonia, however, was much less successful in historical Macedonia, which beside Slavs had compact Greek and Aromanian populations. The Hellenic idea and the Patriarchate of Constantinople preserved much of their earlier influence among local Bulgarians and the arrival of the Bulgarian idea turned the region into a battlefield between those owing allegiance to the Patriarchate and tose to Exarchate with division lines often separating family and kin.

European ethnographs and linguists until the Congress of Berlin usually regarded the language of the Slavic population of Macedonia as Bulgarian. French scholars Ami Boué in 1840 and Guillaume Lejean in 1861, Germans August Grisebach in 1841, J. Hahn in 1858 and 1863, August Heinrich Petermann in 1869 and Heinrich Kiepert in 1876, Slovak Pavel Jozef Šafárik in 1842 and the Czechs Karel Jaromír Erben in 1868 and F. Brodaska in 1869, Englishmen James Wyld in 1877 and Georgina Muir Mackenzie and Adeline Paulina Irby in 1863, Serbians Davidovitch in 1848, Constant Desjardins in 1853 and Stjepan Verković in 1860, Russians Victor Grigorovich in 1848 Vikentij Makušev and Mikhail Mirkovich in 1867, as well as Austrian Karl Sax in 1878 published ethnography or linguistic books, or travel notes, which defined the Slavic population of Macedonia as Bulgarian. Austrian doctor Josef Müller published travel notes in 1844 in which he regarded the Slavic population of Macedonia as Serbian. The region was further identified as predominantly Greek by French F. Bianconi in 1877 and by Englishman Edward Stanford in 1877. He maintained that the urban population of Macedonia was entirely Greek, whereas the peasantry was of mixed, Bulgarian-Greek origin and had Greek consciousness but had not yet mastered the Greek language.

Macedonian question

In Europe, the classic non-national states were the multi-ethnic empires such as the Ottoman Empire, ruled by a Sultan and the population belonged to many ethnic groups, which spoke many languages. The idea of nation state was an increasing emphasis during the 19th century, on the ethnic and racial origins of the nations. The most noticeable characteristic was the degree to which nation-states use the state as an instrument of national unity, in economic, social and cultural life. By the 19th century, the Ottomans had fallen well behind the rest of Europe in science, technology, and industry. By that time Bulgarians had initiated a purposeful struggle against the Greek clerics. Bulgarian religious leaders had realised that any further struggle for the rights of the Bulgarians in the Ottoman Empire could not succeed unless they managed to obtain at least some degree of autonomy from the Patriarchate of Constantinople. The foundation of the Bulgarian Exarchate in 1870, which included most of Macedonia by a firman of Sultan Abdülaziz was the direct result of the struggle of the Bulgarian Orthodox against the domination of the Greek Patriarchate of Constantinople in the 1850s and 1860s.

Afterward, in 1876 the Bulgarians revolted in the April uprising. The emergence of Bulgarian national sentiments was closely related to the re-establishment of the independent Bulgarian church. This rise of national awareness became known as the Bulgarian National Revival. However, the uprising was crushed by the Ottomans. As a result, on the Constantinople Conference in 1876 the predominant Bulgarian character of the Slavs in Macedonia reflected in the borders of future autonomous Bulgaria as it was drawn there. The Great Powers eventually gave their consent to variant, which excluded historical Macedonia and Thrace, and denied Bulgaria access to the Aegean sea, but otherwise incorporated all other regions in the Ottoman Empire inhabited by Bulgarians. At the last minute, however, the Ottomans rejected the plan with the secret support of Britain. Having its reputation at stake, Russia had no other choice but to declare war on the Ottomans in April 1877. The Treaty of San Stefano from 1878, which reflected the maximum desired by Russian expansionist policy, gave Bulgaria the whole of Macedonia except Thessaloniki, the Chalcidice peninsula and the valley of the Aliakmon.

The Congress of Berlin in the same year redistributed most Bulgarian territories that the previous treaty had given to the Principality of Bulgaria back to the Ottoman Empire. This included the whole of Macedonia. As a result, in late 1878, the Kresna–Razlog uprising – an unsuccessful Bulgarian revolt against the Ottoman rule in the region of Macedonia – broke out. However the decision taken at the Congress of Berlin soon turned the Macedonian question into "the apple of constant discord" between Serbia, Greece and Bulgaria. The Bulgarian national revival in Macedonia was not unopposed. The Greeks and Serbs, too, had national ambitions in the region, and believed that these could be furthered by a policy of cultural and linguistic dissimilation of the Macedonian Slavs, to be achieved through educational and church propaganda. Nonetheless, by the 1870s the Bulgarians were clearly the dominant national party in Macedonia. It was widely anticipated that the Macedonian Slavs would continue to evolve as an integral part of the Bulgarian nation, and that, in the event of the Ottoman Empire's demise, Macedonia would be included in a Bulgarian successor-state. That these anticipations proved false was due not to any intrinsic peculiarities of the Macedonian Slavs, setting them apart from the Bulgarians, but to a series of catastrophic events, which, over a period of seventy years, diverted the course of Macedonian history away from its presumed trend.

Serbian propaganda 

Nineteenth century Serbian nationalism viewed Serbs as the people chosen to lead and unite all southern Slavs into one country, Yugoslavia (the country of the southern Slavs). The conscience of the peripheral parts of Serbian nation grew, therefore the officials and the wide circles of population considered the Slavs of Macedonia as "Southern Serbs", Moslems as "Islamized Serbs", and Shtokavian speaking part of today's Croatian population as "Catholic Serbs". But, the basic interests of Serbian state policy was directed to the liberation of the Ottoman regions of Bosnia and Herzegovina, and Kosovo; whilst Macedonia and Vojvodina should be "liberated later".

The Congress of Berlin of 1878, which granted Bosnia and Herzegovina to Austro-Hungarian occupation and administration whilst nominally Ottoman, redirected Serbia's ambitions to Macedonia and a propaganda campaign was launched at home and abroad to prove the Serbian character of the region. A great contribution to the Serbian cause was made by an astronomer and historian from Trieste, Spiridon Gopčević (also known as Leo Brenner). Gopčević published in 1889 the ethnographic research Macedonia and Old Serbia, which defined more than three-quarters of the Macedonian population as Serbian. The population of Kosovo and northern Albania was identified as Serbian or Albanian of Serbian origin (Albanized Serbs, called "Arnauts") and the Greeks along the Aliákmon as Greeks of Serbian origin (Hellenized Serbs).

The work of Gopčević was further developed by two Serbian scholars, geographer Jovan Cvijić and linguist Aleksandar Belić. Less extreme than Gopčević, Cvijić and Belić claimed only the Slavs of northern Macedonia were Serbian whereas those of southern Macedonia were identified as "Macedonian Slavs", an amorphous Slavic mass that was neither Bulgarian, nor Serbian but could turn out either Bulgarian or Serbian if the respective people were to rule the region.

Greek propaganda 

It was established by the end of the 19th century that the majority of the population of central and Southern Macedonia (vilaets of Monastiri and Thessaloniki) were predominantly an ethnic Greek population, while the Northern parts of the region (vilaet of Skopje) were predominantly Slavic. Jews and Ottoman communities were scattered all over. Because of Macedonia's such polyethnic nature, the arguments which Greece used to promote its claim to the whole region were usually of historical and religious character. The Greeks consistently linked nationality to the allegiance to the Patriarchate of Constantinople. "Bulgarophone", "Albanophone" and "Vlachophone" Greeks were coined to describe the population who were Slavic, Albanian or Vlach (Aromanian)-speaking. There was also pressure on Aromanians to become linguistically dissimilated from the 18th century, when dissimilation efforts were encouraged by the Greek missionary Cosmas of Aetolia (1714–1779) who taught that Aromanians should speak Greek because as he said "it's the language of our Church" and established over 100 Greek schools in northern and western Greece. The offensive of the clergy against the use of Aromanian was by no means limited to religious issues but was a tool devised in order to convince the non-Greek speakers to abandon what they regarded as a "worthless" idiom and adopt the superior Greek speech: "There we are Metsovian brothers, together with those who are fooling themselves with this sordid and vile Aromanian language... forgive me for calling it a language", "repulsive speech with a disgusting diction".

As with the Serbian and Bulgarian propaganda efforts, the Greek one initially also concentrated on education. Greek schools in Macedonia at the turn of the 20th century totalled 927 with 1,397 teachers and 57,607 pupils. As from the 1890s, Greece also started sending armed guerrilla groups to Macedonia (see Greek Struggle for Macedonia) especially after the death of Pavlos Melas, which fought the detachments of the Internal Macedonian Revolutionary Organization (IMRO).

The Greek cause predominated in historical Macedonia where it was supported by the native Greeks and by a substantial part of the Slavic and Aromanian populations. Support for the Greeks was much less pronounced in central Macedonia, coming only from a fraction of the local Aromanians and Slavs; in the northern parts of the region it was almost non-existent.

Bulgarian propaganda 

The Bulgarian propaganda made a comeback in the 1890s with regard to both education and arms. At the turn of the 20th century there were 785 Bulgarian schools in Macedonia with 1,250 teachers and 39,892 pupils. The Bulgarian Exarchate held jurisdiction over seven dioceses (Skopje, Debar, Ohrid, Bitola, Nevrokop, Veles and Strumica), i.e., the whole of Vardar and Pirin Macedonia and some of southern Macedonia. The Bulgarian Macedonian-Adrianople Revolutionary Committee (BMARC), which was founded in 1893 as the only guerilla organization established by locals, quickly developed a wide network of committees and agents turning into a "state within the state" in much of Macedonia. The organization changed its name on several occasions, settling to IMRO in 1920. IMRO fought not only against the Ottoman authorities, but also against the pro-Serbian and pro-Greek parties in Macedonia, terrorising the population supporting them.

The failure of the Ilinden-Preobrazhenie Uprising in 1903 signified a second weakening of the Bulgarian cause resulting in closure of schools and a new wave of emigration to Bulgaria. IMRO was also weakened and the number of Serbian and Greek guerilla groups in Macedonia substantially increased. The Exarchate lost the dioceses of Skopje and Debar to the Serbian Patriarchate in 1902 and 1910, respectively. Despite this, the Bulgarian cause preserved its dominant position in central and northern Macedonia and was also strong in southern Macedonia.

The independence of Bulgaria in 1908 had the same effect on the Bulgarian idea in Macedonia as the independence of Greece to the Hellenic a century earlier. The consequences were closure of schools, expelling of priests of the Bulgarian Exarchate and emigration of the majority of the young Macedonian intelligentsia. This first emigration triggered a constant trickle of Macedonian-born refugees and emigrants to Bulgaria. Their number stood at ca. 100,000 by 1912.

Ethnic Macedonian propaganda 

The ethnic Macedonian ideology during the second half of the 19th century was at its inception. One of the first preserved accounts is an article The Macedonian question by Petko Slaveykov, published on 18 January 1871 in the "Macedonia" newspaper in Constantinople. In this article Petko Slaveykov writes: "We have many times heard from the Macedonists that they are not Bulgarians, but they are rather Macedonians, descendants of the Ancient Macedonians". In a letter written to the Bulgarian Exarch in February 1874 Petko Slaveykov reports that discontentment with the current situation "has given birth among local patriots to the disastrous idea of working independently on the advancement of their own local dialect and what’s more, of their own, separate Macedonian church leadership."

In 1880, Georgi Pulevski published Slognica Rechovska in Sofia as an attempt at a grammar of the language of the Slavs who lived in Macedonia. Although he had no formal education, Pulevski published several other books, including three dictionaries and a collection of songs from Macedonia, customs, and holidays.

The first significant manifestation of ethnic Macedonian nationalism was the book За Македонските Работи (Za Makedonskite Raboti – On Macedonian Matters, Sofia, 1903) by Krste Misirkov. In the book Misirkov advocated that the Slavs of Macedonia should take a separate way from the Bulgarians and the Bulgarian language. Misirkov considered that the term "Macedonian" should be used to define the whole Slavic population of Macedonia, obliterating the existing division between Greeks, Bulgarians and Serbians. The adoption of a separate "Macedonian language" was also advocated as a means of unification of the Ethnic Macedonians with Serbian, Bulgarian and Greek consciousness. On Macedonian Matters was written in the South Slavic dialect spoken in central Bitola-Prilep. This dialect was proposed by Misirkov as the basis for the future language, and, as Misirkov says, a dialect which is most different from all other neighboring languages (as the eastern dialect was too close to Bulgarian and the northern one too close to Serbian). Misirkov calls this language Macedonian.

While Misirkov talked about the Macedonian consciousness and the Macedonian language as a future goal, he described the wider region of Macedonia in the early 20th century as inhabited by Bulgarians, Greeks, Serbs, Turks, Albanians, Aromanians, and Jews. As regards to the Ethnic Macedonians themselves, Misirkov maintained that they had called themselves Bulgarians until the publication of the book and were always called Bulgarians by independent observers until 1878 when the Serbian views also started to get recognition. Misirkov rejected the ideas in On Macedonian Matters later and turned into a staunch advocate of the Bulgarian cause – only to return to the ethnic Macedonian idea again in the 1920s. 

Another prominent activist for the ethnic Macedonian national revival was Dimitrija Čupovski, who was one of the founders and the president of the Macedonian Literary Society established in Saint Petersburg in 1902. During the 1913–18 period, Čupovski published the newspaper Makedonski Golos''' (Македонскi Голосъ) (meaning Macedonian voice) in which he and fellow members of the Petersburg Macedonian Colony propagandized the existence of a separate Macedonian people different from Greeks, Bulgarians and Serbs, and were struggling for popularizing the idea for an independent Macedonian state.

Following the Second Balkan War in 1913, the partition of Macedonia among three entities who had taken part in the battle (Serbia, Greece and Bulgaria) placed today's territory within the Kingdom of Serbia. Serbian rule ensured that all ethnic Macedonian symbolism and identity were henceforth proscribed, and only standard Serbian was permitted to be spoken by the locals of Macedonia. In addition, Serbia did not refer to its southern land as Macedonia, a legacy which remains in place today among Serbian nationalists (e.g. the Serbian Radical Party).

The ideas of Misirkov, Pulevski and other ethnic Macedonians would remain largely unnoticed until the 1940s when they were adopted by the Socialist Republic of Yugoslavia influencing the codification of the Macedonian language. Claims of present-day historians from North Macedonia that the "Autonomists" in IMRO who defended a Macedonian position are largely ungrounded. IMRO regarded itself – and was regarded by the Ottoman authorities, the Greek guerilla groups, the contemporary press in Europe and even by Misirkov -as an exclusively Bulgarian organization . The present-day historians from North Macedonia claim that IMRO was split into two factions: the first aimed an ethnic Macedonian state, and the second believed in a Macedonia as a part of wider Bulgarian entity.

 Romanian propaganda 

Attempts at Romanian influence among the Aromanians and Megleno-Romanians of Macedonia began in the early 19th century and were based mainly on linguistic criteria, as well as the claim of a common Thraco-Roman origin of the Romanians (Daco-Romanians) and the Aromanians and Megleno-Romanians. The first Romanian school in Macedonia was established in 1864. Eventually, the total number of schools grew to 93 at the beginning of the 20th century. Romanian influence in the area made some success in Bitola, Kruševo, and in the Aromanian villages in the districts of Bitola and Ohrid. Most Aromanians regard and regarded themselves as a separate ethnic group, and Romanians view such nations as subgroups of a wider Romanian ethnicity. Some Aromanians do identify as part of the Romanian nation however. Currently, among anti-Romanian groups of Aromanians, particularly in Greece, these acts are referred to as "the Romanian propaganda".

 Independent point of view 

Independent sources in Europe between 1878 and 1918 generally tended to view the Slavic population of Macedonia in two ways: as Bulgarians and as Macedonian Slavs. German scholar Gustav Weigand was one of the most prominent representatives of the first trend with the books Ethnography of Macedonia (1924, written 1919) and partially with The Aromanians (1905). The author described all ethnic groups living in Macedonia, showed empirically the close connection between the western Bulgarian dialects and the Macedonian dialects and defined the latter as Bulgarian. The International Commission constituted by the Carnegie Endowment for International Peace in 1913 to inquire into causes and conduct of the Balkan Wars also talked about the Slavs of Macedonia as about Bulgarians in its report published in 1914. The commission had eight members from Great Britain, France, Austria-Hungary, Germany, Russia and the United States.

The term "Macedonian Slavs" was used by scholars and publicists in three general meanings:
 as a politically convenient term to define the Slavs of Macedonia without offending Serbian and Bulgarian nationalism;
 as a distinct group of Slavs different from both Serbs and Bulgarians, yet closer to the Bulgarians and having predominantly Bulgarian ethnical and political affinities;
 as a distinct group of Slavs different from both Serbs and Bulgarians having no developed national consciousness and no fast ethnical and political affinities (the definition of Cvijic).

An instance of the use of the first meaning of the term was, for example, the ethnographic map of the Slavic peoples published in (1890) by Russian scholar Zarjanko, which identified the Slavs of Macedonia as Bulgarians. Following an official protest from Serbia the map was later reprinted identifying them under the politically correct name "Macedonian Slavs".

The term was used in a completely different sense by British journalist Henry Brailsford in Macedonia, its races and their future (1906). The book contains Brailford's impressions from a five-month stay in Macedonia shortly after the suppression of the Ilinden Uprising and represents an ethnographic report. Brailford defines the dialect of Macedonia as neither Serbian, nor Bulgarian, yet closer to the second one. An opinion is delivered that any Slavic nation could "win" Macedonia if it is to use the needed tact and resources, yet it is claimed that the Bulgarians have already done that. Brailsford uses synonymously the terms "Macedonian Slavs" and "Bulgarians", the "Slavic language" and the "Bulgarian language". The chapter on the Macedonians Slavs/the Bulgarians is titled the "Bulgarian movement", the IMRO activists are called "Bulgarophile Macedonians".

The third use of the term can be noted among scholars from the allied countries (above all France and the United Kingdom) after 1915 and is roughly equal to the definition given by Cvijic (see above).

 Development of the name "Macedonian Slavs" 

The name "Macedonian Slavs" started to appear in publications at the end of the 1880s and the beginning of the 1890s. Though the successes of the Serbian propaganda effort had proved that the Slavic population of Macedonia was not only Bulgarian, they still failed to convince that this population was, in fact, Serbian. Rarely used until the end of the 19th century compared to 'Bulgarians', the term 'Macedonian Slavs' served more to conceal rather than define the national character of the population of Macedonia. Scholars resorted to it usually as a result of Serbian pressure or used it as a general term for the Slavs inhabiting Macedonia regardless of their ethnic affinities. The Serbian politician Stojan Novaković proposed in 1887 employing the Macedonistic ideas as they means to counteract the Bulgarian influence in Macedonia, thereby promoting Serbian interests in the region.

However, by the beginning of the 20th century, the continued Serbian propaganda effort and especially the work of Cvijic had managed to firmly entrench the concept of the Macedonian Slavs in European public opinion, and the name was used almost as frequently as 'Bulgarians'. Even pro-Bulgarian researchers such as H. Henry Brailsford and N. Forbes argued that the Macedonian Slavs differed from both Bulgarians and Serbs. Practically all scholars before 1915, however, including strongly pro-Serbian ones such as Robert William Seton-Watson, admitted that the affinities of the majority of them lay with the Bulgarian cause and the Bulgarians and classified them as such. Even in 1914 the Carnegie Commission report states that the Serbs and Greeks classified the Slavs of Macedonia as a distinct group "Slav-Macedonians" for political purposes and this term is "political euphemism designed to conceal the existence of Bulgarians in Macedonia".

Bulgaria's entry into World War I on the side of the Central Powers signified a dramatic shift in the way European public opinion viewed the Slavic population of Macedonia. For the Central Powers the Slavs of Macedonia became nothing but Bulgarians, whereas for the Allies they turned into anything other than Bulgarians. The ultimate victory of the Allies in 1918 led to the victory of the vision of the Slavic population of Macedonia as Macedonian Slavs, an amorphous Slavic mass without a developed national consciousness.

During the 1920s the Comintern developed a new policy for the Balkans, about collaboration between the communists and the Macedonian movement, and the creation of a united Macedonian movement. The idea for a new unified organization was supported by the Soviet Union, which saw a chance of using this well developed revolutionary movement to spread revolution in the Balkans and destabilize the Balkan monarchies. In the so-called May Manifesto of 6 May 1924, for the first time the objectives of the unified Slav Macedonian liberation movement were presented: independence and unification of partitioned Macedonia, fighting all the neighbouring Balkan monarchies, forming a Balkan Communist Federation and cooperation with the Soviet Union.

Later the Comintern published a resolution about the recognition of Macedonian ethnicity. The text of this document was prepared in the period December 20, 1933 – January 7, 1934, by the Balkan Secretariat of the Comintern. It was accepted by the Political Secretariat in Moscow on January 11, 1934, and approved by the Executive Committee of the Comintern. The Resolution was published for the first time in the April issue of Makedonsko Delo under the title ‘The Situation in Macedonia and the Tasks of IMRO (United)’.

 Absent national consciousness 
What stood behind the difficulties to properly define the nationality of the Slavic population of Macedonia was the apparent levity with which this population regarded it. The existence of a separate Macedonian national consciousness prior to the 1940s is disputed.Stephen Palmer, Robert King, Yugoslav Communism and the Macedonian question, Hamden, CT Archon Books, 1971, pp. 199-200 This confusion is illustrated by Robert Newman in 1935, who recounts discovering in a village in Vardar Macedonia two brothers, one who considered himself a Serb, and the other considered himself a Bulgarian. In another village he met a man who had been, "a Macedonian peasant all his life", but who had varyingly been called a Turk, a Serb and a Bulgarian. However anti-Serb and pro-Bulgarian feelings among the local population at this period prevailed.

Nationality in early-20th-century Macedonia was a matter of political convictions and financial benefits, of what was considered politically correct at the specific time and of which armed guerrilla group happened to visit the respondent's home last. The process of Hellenization at the end of the 18th and the beginning of the 19th century affected only a limited stratum of the population, the Bulgarian Revival in the middle of the 19th century was too short to form a solid Bulgarian consciousness, the financial benefits given by the Serbian propaganda were too tempting to be declined. It was not a rare occurrence for whole villages to switch their nationality from Greek to Bulgarian and then to Serbian within a few years or to be Bulgarian in the presence of a Bulgarian commercial agent and Serbian in the presence of a Serbian consul. On several occasions peasants were reported to have answered in the affirmative when asked if they were Bulgarians and again in the affirmative when asked if they were Serbs. Though this certainly cannot be valid for the whole population, many Russian and Western diplomats and travelers defined Macedonians as lacking a "proper" national consciousness.

 Statistical data 
Ottoman statistics
The basis of the Ottoman censuses was the millet system. People were assigned to ethnic categories according to religious affiliation. So all Sunni Muslims were categorised as Turks, all members of Greek Orthodox church as Greeks, while rest being divided between Bulgarian and Serb Orthodox churches. All censuses concluded that the province is of Christian majority, among whom the Bulgarians prevail.

1882 Ottoman census in Macedonia:

1895 census:

Special survey in 1904 of Hilmi Pasha of the three Macedonian vilayets of Selanik, Manastir and Kosovo (648 thousand followes of the Ecumenical Patriarchate and 557 thousand faithful of the Bulgarian Exarchate, but an additional 250 thousand of the former) had identified as Bulgarian speakers. The survey also extends to parts of the three vilayets which are not part of the region of Macedonia, i.e., Sandžak, Kosovo, parts of eastern Albania and Epirus. 

Census 1906:

Rival statistical data

Encyclopædia Britannica
The 1911 edition of the Encyclopædia Britannica gave the following statistical estimates about the population of Macedonia:
Slavs (described in the encyclopaedia as a "Slavonic population, the bulk of which is regarded by almost all independent sources as Bulgarians"): approximately 1,150,000, whereof, 1,000,000 Orthodox and 150,000 Muslims (called Pomaks)
Turks: ca. 500,000 (Muslims)
Greeks: ca. 250,000, whereof ca. 240,000 Orthodox and 14,000 Muslims
Albanians: ca. 120,000, whereof 10,000 Orthodox and 110,000 Muslims
Vlachs: ca. 90,000 Orthodox and 3,000 Muslims
Jews: ca. 75,000
Roma: ca. 50,000, whereof 35,000 Orthodox and 15,000 Muslims

In total 1,300,000 Christians (almost exclusively Orthodox), 800,000 Muslims, 75,000 Jews, a total population of ca. 2,200,000 for the whole of Macedonia.

It needs to be taken into account that part of the Slavic-speaking population in southern Macedonia regarded itself as ethnically Greek and a smaller percentage, mostly in northern Macedonia, as Serbian. All Muslims (except the Albanians) tended to view themselves and were viewed as Turks, irrespective of their mother tongue.

Sample statistical data from neutral sources
The following data reflects the population of the wider region of Macedonia as it was defined by Serbs and Bulgarians (Aegean, Vardar and Pirin), roughly corresponding to Manastir Vilayet, Salonica Vilayet and Kosovo Vilayet of Ottoman Macedonia which was significantly larger than the traditional region known to the Greeks.

After the great population exchanges of the 1920s, 380,000 Turks left Greece and 538,253 Greeks came to Macedonia from Asia Minor. After the signing of the Treaty of Neuilly-sur-Seine in 1919, Greece and Bulgaria agreed on a population exchange on the remaining Bulgarian minority in Macedonia. In the same year some 66,000 Bulgarians and other Slavophones left to Bulgaria and Serbia, while 58,709 Greeks entered Greece from Bulgaria

Statistical data of Greek Macedonia
According to A. Angelopoulos, published in the Journal of Balkan Studies, Greek Macedonia's national makeup in 1913 was 44.2% Greek, 38.9% Muslim, 8.7% Bulgarian and 8.2% others.Angelopoulos A., Population distribution of Greece Today according to Language, National Consciousness and Religion, Balkan Studies, 20, p.123-132, 1979 According to a Carnegie survey based on the ethnographic map of Southern Macedonia, representing the ethnic distribution on the eve of the 1912 Balkan war, published in 1913 by Mr. J. Ivanov, lecturer at the University of Sofia. The total numbers belonging to the various nationalities in a territory a little larger than the portion in the same region ceded to the Greeks by the Turks was 1,042,029 inhabitants, of whom 329,371 Bulgarians, 314,854 Turks, 236,755 Greeks, 68,206 Jews, 44,414 Wallachians, 25,302 Gypsies, 15,108 Albanians, 8,019 Miscellaneous.

According to the League of Nations and at the 1928 census the population consisted of 1,341,00 Greeks (88.8%), 77,000 Bulgarians (5%), 2,000 Turks and 91,000 others, but according to Greek archival sources the total number of the Slavic speakers was 200,000.

20th century
The Balkan Wars (1912–1913) and World War I (1914–1918) left the region of Macedonia divided among Greece, Serbia, Bulgaria, and Albania and resulted in significant changes in its ethnic composition. 51% of the region's territory went to Greece, 38% to Serbia and 10% to Bulgaria. At least several hundred thousand left their homes, while the rest were also subjected to assimilation as all "liberators" after the Balkan War wanted to assimilate as many inhabitants as possible and colonize with settlers from their respective nation. The Greeks become the largest population in the region. The formerly leading Muslim and Bulgarian communities were reduced either by deportation (through population exchange) or by change of identity.

 Greece 
The Slavic population was viewed as Slavophone Greeks and prepared to be reeducated in Greek. Any vestiges of Bulgarian and Slavic Macedonia in Greece have been eliminated from the Balkan Wars, continuing to the present. The Greeks detested the Bulgarians (Slavs of Macedonia), considering them less than human "bears, practising systematic and inhumane methods of extermination and assimilation. The use of Bulgarian language had been prohibited, for which the persecution by the police peaked, while during the regime of Metaxas a vigorous assimilation campaign was launched. The civilians have been persecuted solely for identifying as Bulgarian with the slogans "If you want to be free, be Greek" "We shall cut your tongues to teach you to speak Greek." "become Greeks again, that being the condition of a peaceful life.""Are you Christians or Bulgarians?" "The voice of Alexander the Great calls to you from the tomb; do you not hear it? You sleep on and go on calling yourselves Bulgarians!" "Wast thou born at Sofia; there are no Bulgarians in Macedonia; the whole population is Greek." "He who goes to live in Bulgaria," was the reply to the protests, "is Bulgarian. No more Bulgarians in Greek Macedonia." The remaining Bulgarians threatened by use of force were made to become Greeks and to sign a declaration stating that they had been Greek since ancient times, but by the influence of komitadji they became Bulgarians only fifteen years ago, but nevertheless there was no real change in consciousness. 
In many villages people were put to prison and then were released after having proclaimed themselves Greeks. The Slavic dialect was considered as being of lowest intelligence with the assumptions that it "consists" only a thousand words of vocabulary. There are official records showing that children professing Bulgarian identity were also murdered for declining to profess Greek identity.

After the Treaty of Bucharest, some 51% of the modern region that was known as Macedonia was won by the Greek state (also known as Aegean or Greek Macedonia). This was the only part of Macedonia that Greece was directly interested in. Greeks regarded this land as the only true region of Macedonia as it geographically corresponded to ancient Macedon and contained an ethnically Greek majority of population. Bulgarian and other non-Greek schools in southern (Greek) Macedonia were closed and Bulgarian teachers and priests were deported as early as the First Balkan War simultaneous to deportation of Greeks from Bulgaria. The bulk of the Slavic population of southeastern Macedonia fled to Bulgaria during the Second Balkan War or was resettled there in the 1920s by virtue of a population exchange agreement. The Slavic minority in Greek Macedonia, who were referred to by the Greek authorities as "Slavomacedonians", "Slavophone Greeks" and "Bulgarisants", were subjected to a gradual assimilation by the Greek majority. Their numbers were reduced by a large-scale emigration to North America in the 1920s and the 1930s and to Eastern Europe and Yugoslavia following the Greek Civil War (1944–1949). At the same time a number of Macedonian Greeks from Monastiri (modern Bitola) entered Greece.

The 1923 Compulsory population exchange between Greece and Turkey led to a radical change in the ethnic composition of Greek Macedonia. Some 380,000 Turks and other Muslims left the region and were replaced by 538,253 Greeks from Asia Minor and Eastern Thrace, including Pontic Greeks from northeastern Anatolia and Caucasus Greeks from the South Caucasus.

Greece was attacked and occupied by Nazi-led Axis during World War II. By the beginning of 1941 the whole of Greece was under a tripartite German, Italian and Bulgarian occupation. The Bulgarians were permitted to occupy western Thrace and parts of Greek Macedonia, where they persecuted and committed massacres and other atrocities against the Greek population. The once thriving Jewish community of Thessaloniki was decimated by the Nazis, who deported 60,000 of the city's Jews to the German death camps in Germany and German-occupied Poland. Large Jewish populations in the Bulgarian occupied zone were deported by the Bulgarian army and had an equal death rate to the German zone.

The Bulgarian Army occupied the whole of Eastern Macedonia and Western Thrace, where it was greeted from a part of a Slav-speakers as liberators. Unlike Germany and Italy, Bulgaria officially annexed the occupied territories, which had long been a target of Bulgarian irridentism. A massive campaign of "Bulgarisation" was launched, which saw all Greek officials deported. This campaign was successful especially in Eastern and later in Central Macedonia, when Bulgarians entered the area in 1943. All Slav-speakers there were regarded as Bulgarians. However it was not so effective in German-occupied Western Macedonia. A ban was placed on the use of the Greek language, the names of towns and places changed to the forms traditional in Bulgarian.

In addition, the Bulgarian government tried to alter the ethnic composition of the region, by expropriating land and houses from Greeks in favour of Bulgarian settlers. The same year, the German High Command approved the foundation of a Bulgarian military club in Thessaloníki. The Bulgarians organized supplying of food and provisions for the Slavic population in Central and Western Macedonia, aiming to gain the local population that was in the German and Italian occupied zones. The Bulgarian clubs soon started to gain support among parts of the population. Many Communist political prisoners were released with the intercession of Bulgarian Club in Thessaloniki, which had made representations to the German occupation authorities. They all declared Bulgarian ethnicity. In 1942, the Bulgarian club asked assistance from the High command in organizing armed units among the Slavic-speaking population in northern Greece. For this purpose, the Bulgarian army, under the approval of the German forces in the Balkans sent a handful of officers from the Bulgarian Army, to the zones occupied by the Italian and German troops to be attached to the German occupying forces as "liaison officers". All the Bulgarian officers brought into service were locally born Macedonians who had immigrated to Bulgaria with their families during the 1920s and 1930s as part of the Greek-Bulgarian Treaty of Neuilly which saw 90,000 Bulgarians migrating to Bulgaria from Greece.

With the help of Bulgarian officers several pro-Bulgarian and anti-Greek armed detachments (Ohrana) were organized in the Kastoria, Florina and Edessa districts of occupied Greek Macedonia in 1943. These were led by Bulgarian officers originally from Greek Macedonia; Andon Kalchev and Georgi Dimchev. Ohrana (meaning Defense) was an autonomist pro-Bulgarian organization fighting for unification with Greater Bulgaria. Uhrana was supported from IMRO leader Ivan Mihaylov too. It was apparent that Mihailov had broader plans which envisaged the creation of a Macedonian state under a German control. It was also anticipated that the IMRO volunteers would form the core of the armed forces of a future Independent Macedonia in addition to providing administration and education in the Florina, Kastoria and Edessa districts. In the summer of 1944, Ohrana constituted some 12,000 fighters and volunteers from Bulgaria charged with protection of the local population. During 1944, whole Slavophone villages were armed by the occupation authorities and developed into the most formidable enemy of the Greek People's Liberation Army (ELAS). Ohrana was dissolved in late 1944 after the German and Bulgarian withdrawal from Greece and Josip Broz Tito's Partisans movement hardly concealed its intention of expanding. After World War II, many former "Ohranists" were convicted of a military crimes as collaborationists. It was from this period, after Bulgaria's conversion to communism, that some Slav-speakers in Greece who had referred to themselves as "Bulgarians" increasingly began to identify as "Macedonians".

Following the defeat of the Axis powers and the evacuation of the Nazi occupation forces many members of the Ohrana joined the SNOF where they could still pursue their goal of secession. The advance of the Red Army into Bulgaria in September 1944, the withdrawal of the German armed forces from Greece in October, meant that the Bulgarian Army had to withdraw from Greek Macedonia and Thrace. A large proportion of Bulgarians and Slavic speakers emigrated there. In 1944 the declarations of Bulgarian nationality were estimated by the Greek authorities, on the basis of monthly returns, to have reached 16,000 in the districts of German-occupied Greek Macedonia, but according to British sources, declarations of Bulgarian nationality throughout Western Macedonia reached 23,000.

By 1945 World War II had ended and Greece was in open civil war. It has been estimated that after the end of World War II over 40,000 people fled from Greece to Yugoslavia and Bulgaria. To an extent the collaboration of the peasants with the Germans, Italians, Bulgarians or the Greek People's Liberation Army (ELAS) was determined by the geopolitical position of each village. Depending upon whether their village was vulnerable to attack by the Greek communist guerrillas or the occupation forces, the peasants would opt to support the side in relation to which they were most vulnerable. In both cases, the attempt was to promise "freedom" (autonomy or independence) to the formerly persecuted Slavic minority as a means of gaining its support.

The National Liberation Front (NOF) was organized by the political and military groups of the Slavic minority in Greece, active from 1945 to 1949. The interbellum was the time when part of them came to the conclusion that they are Macedonians. Greek hostility to the Slavic minority produced tensions that rose to separatism. After the recognition in 1934 from the Comintern of the Macedonian ethnicity, the Greek communists have also recognized Macedonian national identity. Soon after the first "free territories" were created it was decided that ethnic Macedonian schools would open in the area controlled by the DSE. Books written in the ethnic Macedonian language were published, while ethnic Macedonians theatres and cultural organizations operated. Also within the NOF, a female organization, the Women's Antifascist Front (AFZH), and a youth organization, the National Liberation Front of Youth (ONOM), were formed.

The creation of the ethnic Macedonian cultural institutions in the Democratic Army of Greece (DSE)-held territory, newspapers and books published by NOF, public speeches and the schools opened, helped the consolidation of the ethnic Macedonian conscience and identity among the population. According to information announced by Paskal Mitrovski on the I plenum of NOF in August 1948 – about 85% of the Slavic-speaking population in Greek Macedonia has ethnic Macedonian self-identity. The language that was thought in the schools was the official language of the Socialist Republic of Macedonia. About 20,000 young ethnic Macedonians learned to read and write using that language, and learned their own history.

From 1946 until the end of the Civil War in 1949, the NOF was loyal to Greece and was fighting for minimal human rights within the borders of a Greek republic. But in order to mobilize more ethnic Macedonians into the DSE it was declared on 31 January 1949 at the 5th Meeting of the KKE Central Committee that when the DSE took power in Greece there would be an independent Macedonian state, united in its geographical borders. This new line of the KKE affected the mobilisation rate of ethnic Macedonians (which even earlier was considerably high), but did not manage, ultimately, to change the course of the war.

The government forces destroyed every village that was on their way, and expelled the civilian population. Leaving as a result of force or on their own accord (in order to escape oppression and retaliation), 50,000 people left Greece together with the retreating DSE forces. All of them were sent to Eastern Bloc countries. It was not until the 1970s that some of them were allowed to come to the Socialist Republic of Macedonia. In the 1980s, the Greek parliament adopted the law of national reconciliation which allowed DSE members "of Greek origin" to repatriate to Greece, where they were given land. Ethnic Macedonian DSE remembers remained excluded from the terms of this legislation.

On August 20, 2003, the Rainbow Party hosted a reception for the "child refugees", ethnic Macedonian children who fled their homes during the Greek Civil War who were permitted to enter Greece for a maximum of 20 days. Now elderly, this was the first time many of them saw their birthplaces and families in some 55 years. The reception included relatives of the refugees who are living in Greece and are members of Rainbow Party. However, many were refused entry by Greek border authorities because their passports listed the former names of their places of birth.

The present number of the "Slavophones" in Greece has been subject to much speculation with varying numbers. As Greece does not hold census based on self-determination and mother tongue, no official data is available. It should be noted, however, that the official Macedonian Slav party in Greece receives at an average only 1000 votes. For more information about the region and its population see Slavic speakers of Greek Macedonia.

 Yugoslavia 
After the Balkan Wars (1912–1913) the Slavs in Macedonia were regarded as southern Serbs and the language they spoke a southern Serbian dialect. Despite their attempts of forceful assimilation, Serb colonists in Vardar Macedonia numbered only 100,000 by 1942, so there was not that colonization and expulsion as in Greek Macedonia. Ethnic cleansing was unlikely in Serbia, Bulgarians were given to sign declaration for being Serbs since ancient times, those who refused to sign faced assimilation through terror, while Muslims faced similar discrimination. However, in 1913 Bulgarian revolts broke out in Tikvesh, Negotino, Kavadarci, Vartash, Ohrid, Debar and Struga, and more than 260 villages were burnt down. Serbian officials are documented to have buried alive three Bulgarian civilians from Pehčevo then. Bulgarians were forced to sign a petition "Declare yourself a Serb or die." 90,000 Serbian troops were deployed in Macedonia to keep down resistance from Serbianization, Serbian colonists were unsuccessfully encouraged to immigrate with the slogan "for the good of Serbs", but the Albanians and Turks to emigrate. In the next centuries, a sense of a distinct Macedonian nation emerged partly as a result of the resistance of IMRO, despite it was split into one Macedonist and one pro-Bulgarian wing. In 1918 the use of Bulgarian and Macedonian language was prohibited in Serbian Macedonia.

The Bulgarian, Greek and Romanian schools were closed, the Bulgarian priests and all non-Serbian teachers were expelled. Bulgarian surname endings '-ov/-ev' were replaced with the typically Serbian ending '-ich' and the population which considered itself Bulgarian was heavily persecuted. The policy of Serbianization in the 1920s and 1930s clashed with popular pro-Bulgarian sentiment stirred by IMRO detachments infiltrating from Bulgaria, whereas local communists favoured the path of self-determination suggested by the Yugoslav Communist Party in the 1924 May Manifesto.

In 1925, D. J. Footman, the British vice consul at Skopje, addressed a lengthy report for the Foreign Office. He wrote that "the majority of the inhabitants of Southern Serbia are Orthodox Christian Macedonians, ethnologically more akin to the Bulgarians than to the Serbs." He acknowledged that the Macedonians were better disposed toward Bulgaria because, Bulgarian education system in Macedonia in the time of the Turks, was widespread and effective; and because Macedonians at the time perceived Bulgarian culture and prestige to be higher than those of its neighbors. Moreover, large numbers of Macedonians educated in Bulgarian schools had sought refuge in Bulgaria before and especially after the partitions of 1913. "There is therefore now a large Macedonian element in Bulgaria, continued represented in all Government Departments and occupying high positions in the army and in the civil service...." He characterized this element as "Serbophobe, [it] mostly desires the incorporation of Macedonia in Bulgaria, and generally supports the IMRO." However, he also pointed to the existence of the tendency to seek an independent Macedonia with Salonica as its capital. "This movement also had adherents among the Macedonian colony in Bulgaria."

Bulgarian troops were welcomed as liberators in 1941 but mistakes of the Bulgarian administration made a growing number of people resent their presence by 1944. It must also to be noted that the Bulgarian army during the annexation of the region, was partially recruited from the local population, which formed as much as 40%-60% of the soldiers in certain battalions. Some recent data has announced that even the National Liberation War of Macedonia has resembled ethno-political motivated civil war.СТЕНОГРАФСКИ БЕЛЕШКИ  Тринаесеттото продолжение на Четиринаесеттата седница на Собранието на Република Македонија, 17 January 2007. After the war the region received the status of a constituent republic within Yugoslavia and in 1945 a separate, Macedonian language was codified. The population was declared Macedonian, a nationality different from both Serbs and Bulgarians. The decision was politically motivated and aimed at weakening the position of Serbia within Yugoslavia and of Bulgaria with regard to Yugoslavia. Surnames were again changed to include the ending '-ski', which was to emphasise the unique nature of the ethnic Macedonian population.

From the start of the new Socialist Federal Republic of Yugoslavia (SFRY), accusations surfaced that new authorities in Macedonia were involved in retribution against people who did not support the formation of the new Yugoslav Macedonian republic. The numbers of dead "counter-revolutionaries" due to organized killings, however is unclear. Besides, many people went throughout the Labor camp of Goli Otok in the middle 1940s. This chapter of the partisan's history was a taboo subject for conversation in the SFRY until the late 1980s, and as a result, decades of official silence created a reaction in the form of numerous data manipulations for nationalist communist propaganda purposes.

At the times of Croatian ruling-class of Yugoslavia, Vardar Banovina Province was turned into autonomous Macedonia with a majority of the population declaring on census as ethnic Macedonians, and a Macedonian language as the official, recognized as distinct from Serbo-Croatian. The capital was placed in a Torlakian-speaking region. Persecution of Bulgarian identity by the state continued, along with propaganda.

After the creation of Macedonian Republic the Presidium of ASNOM which was the highest political organ in Macedonia made several statements and actions that were de facto boycotting the decisions of AVNOJ. Instead of obeying the order of Tito's General Headquarters to send the main forces of the NOV of Macedonia to participate in the fighting in the Srem area for the final liberation of Yugoslavia, the cadre close to President Metodija Andonov – Cento gave serious thoughts whether it is better to order the preparation for an advance of the 100.000 armed men under his command toward northern Greece in order to "unify the Macedonian people" into one country. Officers loyal to Chento's ideas made a mutiny in the garrison stationed on Skopje's fortress, but the mutiny was suppressed by armed intervention. A dozen officers were shot on place, others sentenced to life imprisonment. Also Chento and his close associates were trying to minimize the ties with Yugoslavia as far as possible and were constantly mentioning the unification of the Macedonian people into one state, which was against the decisions of AVNOJ. Chento was even talking about the possibility to create an independent Macedonia backed by the US. The Yugoslav secret police made a decisive action and managed to arrest Metodija Andonov - Chento and his closest men and prevent his policies. Chento's place was taken by Lazar Kolishevski, who started fully implementing the pro-Yugoslav line.

Later the authorities organised frequent purges and trials of Macedonian people charged with autonomist deviation. Many of the former IMRO (United) government officials, were purged from their positions then isolated, arrested, imprisoned or executed on various (in many cases fabricated) charges including: pro-Bulgarian leanings, demands for greater or complete independence of Yugoslav Macedonia, forming of conspirative political groups or organisations, demands for greater democracy, etc. People as Panko Brashnarov, Pavel Shatev, Dimitar Vlahov and Venko Markovski were quickly ousted from the new government, and some of them assassinated. On the other hand, former IMRO-members, followers of Ivan Mihailov, were also persecuted by the Belgrade-controlled authorities on accusations of collaboration with the Bulgarian occupation. Metodi Shatorov's supporters in Vardar Macedonia, called Sharlisti, were systematically exterminated by the Yugoslav Communist Party (YCP) in the autumn of 1944, and repressed for their anti-Yugoslav and pro-Bulgarian political positions.

The encouragement and evolution of the culture of the Republic of Macedonia has had a far greater and more permanent impact on Macedonian nationalism than has any other aspect of Yugoslav policy. While development of national music, films and the graphic arts has been encouraged in the Republic of Macedonia, the greatest cultural effect has come from the codification of the Macedonian language and literature, the new Macedonian national interpretation of history and the establishment of a Macedonian Orthodox Church in 1967 by Central Committee of the Communist Party of Macedonia.

 Bulgaria 

The Bulgarian population in Pirin Macedonia remained Bulgarian after 1913. The "Macedonian question" became especially prominent after the Balkan wars in 1912–1913, followed from the withdraw of the Ottoman Empire and the subsequent division of the region of Macedonia between Greece, Bulgaria and Serbia. The Slav – speakers in Macedonia tended to be Christian peasants, but the majority of them were under the influence of the Bulgarian Exarchate and its education system, thus considered themselves as Bulgarians.The Races and Religions of Macedonia, "National Geographic", Nov 1912 Moreover, Bulgarians in Bulgaria believed that most of the population of Macedonia was Bulgarian. Before the Balkan Wars the regional Macedonian dialects were treated as Bulgarian and the Exarchate school system taught the locals in Bulgarian. Following the Balkan wars the Bulgarian Exarchate activity in most of the region was discontinued. After World War I, the territory of the present-day North Macedonia came under the direct rule of the Kingdom of Yugoslavia and was sometimes termed "Southern Serbia". Together with a portion of today's Serbia, it belonged officially to the newly formed Vardar Banovina. An intense program of Serbianization was implemented during the 1920s and 1930s when Belgrade enforced a Serbian cultural assimilation process on the region. Between the two world wars in Vardar Banovina, the regional Macedonian dialects were declared as Serbian and the Serbian language was introduced in the schools and administration as official language. There was implemented a governmental policy of assassinations and assimilation. The Serbian administration in Vardar Banovina felt insecure and that provoked its brutal reprisals on the local peasant population.
Greece, like all other Balkan states, adopted restrictive policies towards its minorities, namely towards its Slavic population in its northern regions, due to its experiences with Bulgaria's wars, including the Second Balkan War, and the Bulgarian inclination of sections of its Slavic minority.

IMRO was a "state within the state" in the region in the 1920s using it to launch attacks in the Serbian and Greek parts of Macedonia. By that time IMRO had become a right-wing Bulgarian ultranationalist organization. According to IMRO statistics during the 1920s in the region of Yugoslav (Vardar) Macedonia operated 53 chetas (armed bands), 36 of which penetrated from Bulgaria, 12 were local and 5 entered from Albania. In the region of Greek (Aegean) Macedonia 24 chetas and 10 local reconnaissance detachments were active. Thousands local of Slavophone Macedonians were repressed by the Yugoslav and Greek authorities on suspicions of contacts with the revolutionary movement. The population in Pirin Macedonia was organized in a mass people's home guard. This militia was the only force, which resisted to the Greek army when general Pangalos launched a military campaign against Petrich District in 1925, speculatively called the War of the Stray Dog. IMRO's constant fratricidal killings and assassinations abroad provoked some within Bulgarian military after the coup of 19 May 1934 to take control and break the power of the organization. Meanwhile, the left-wing later did form the new organisation based on the principles of independence and unification of partitioned Macedonia. The new organisation which was an opponent to Ivan Mihailov's IMRO was called IMRO (United). It was founded in 1925 in Vienna. However, it did not have real popular support and remained active until 1936 and was funded by and closely linked to the Comintern and the Balkan Communist Federation. In 1934 the Comintern adopted resolution about the recognition of Macedonian nation and confirmed the project of the Balkan Communist Federation about creation of Balkan Federative Republic, including Macedonia.

The outbreak of World War II on 1 September 1939, inspired the whole Macedonian community, foremost the refugees from the occupied parts, to seek ways for the liberation of Macedonia. Early in 1941 the British vice-consul at Skopje provided the Foreign Office with an even more extensive and perceptive analysis of the current state of the Macedonian question. He claimed that the vast majority of the Macedonians belonged to the national movement; indeed, he estimated "that 90 percent of all Slav Macedonians were autonomists in one sense or another...." Because the movement was wrapped in secrecy, however, it was extremely difficult to gauge the relative strength of its various currents, except that it could be assumed that IMRO had lost ground since it was banned in Bulgaria and its leaders exiled.

Between 6 April 1941 and 17 April 1941, Axis forces invaded the Kingdom of Yugoslavia. The Axis victory was swift, as Yugoslavia had surrendered within 11 days. Macedonian newspaper "Makedonska Tribuna", an organ of Macedonian Patriotic Organisation, published by Macedonian immigrants in the U.S. and Canada, vaunted the German victory in the Invasion and fall of the Kingdom Yugoslavia. At the beginning of the Invasion of Yugoslavia a meeting was held on April 8, 1941, in Skopje, in which participated mainly followers of the idea for the liberation through independence or autonomy of Macedonia. There were activists of IMRO, as well as Yugoslav Communists – former IMRO (United) members, followers of the idea for the creation of a pro-Bulgarian Macedonian state under |German and Italian protection. This meeting was to decide of action towards independence of Macedonia, but the situation changed dynamically. The local population in North Macedonia met with joy the defeat of Kingdom of Yugoslavia. It saw as the end of Serbian rule and it was not surprising that the soldiers from Vardar Macedonia, mobilized in the Yugoslav army in large numbers refuse to fight. The Serbian administration in most places had run away afraid not as much of the Germans or Bulgarians but of the revenge of the local population.

Although the Bulgarian government had officially joined the Axis Powers, it maintained a course of military passivity during the initial stages of the Invasion of Yugoslavia and the Battle of Greece. German, Italian, and Hungarian troops crushed opposing forces of Yugoslavia and Greece but on 6 April 1941, Yugoslavian airplanes bombed the Bulgarian town of Kyustendil, with 67 people killed and 90 wounded and a suburb of Sofia where 8 people were killed. The Yugoslav government surrendered on April 17. The Greek government was to hold out until April 30. On 18 April 1941 the Bulgarian government received a telegram from Joachim von Ribbentrop in which he specified the regions to be taken by units of the Bulgarian army. In Greece, the units were to occupy Thrace, as well as Macedonia between the Strymon and Nestos rivers. In Yugoslavia, the Bulgarians were to occupy an area from the river Vardar and Pomoravlje to the Pirot-Vranje-Skopje line. Ribbentrop's telegram said that the line was temporary, i.e., that it could be moved to the west of the river Vardar as well.

The movement of the Bulgarian army in Yugoslavia started on April 19, and in Greece on April 20. The prominent force which occupied most of Vardar Macedonia, was the Bulgarian 5th Army. The 6th and 7th Infantry Divisions were active in invading the Vardar Banovina between 19 and 24 April 1941. The Bulgarian troops were mainly present in the western part of Vardar Macedonia, close to the Italian occupational zone, because of some border clashes with Italians, who implemented Albanian interests and terrorized the local peasants. So the most of Vardar Banovina, (including Vardar Macedonia), was annexed by Bulgaria and along with various other regions became Greater Bulgaria. The westernmost parts of Vardar Macedonia was occupied by the fascist Kingdom of Italy. As the Bulgarian Army entered Vardar Macedonia on 19 April 1941, it was greeted by the local population as liberators as it meant the end of Serbian rule. Former IMRO and IMRO (United) members were active in organizing Bulgarian Action Committees charged with taking over the local authorities. Bulgarian Action Committees propagated a proclamation to the Bulgarians in North Macedonia on occasion of the invasion of the Bulgarian Army in the Vardar Banovina. As regards the Serbian colonists, the members of the campaign committees were adamant—they had to be deported as soon as possible and their properties to be returned to the locals. With the arrival of the Bulgarian army mass expulsion of Serbs from the area of the Vardar Macedonia took place. First, the city dwellers were deported in 1941, then all of the suspected pro-Serbs. Metodi Shatarov-Šarlo, who was a local leader of the Yugoslav Communist Party, also refused to define the Bulgarian forces as occupiers (contrary to instructions from Belgrade) and called for the incorporation of the local Macedonian Communist organizations within the Bulgarian Communist Party (BCP). The Macedonian Regional Committee refused to remain in contact with Communist Party of Yugoslavia (CPY) and linked up with BCP as soon as the invasion of Yugoslavia started. The CPY formally decided to launch an armed uprising on 4 July 1941 but Šarlo refused to distribute the proclamation of calling for military actions against Bulgarians. More than 12,000 Yugoslav Macedonian prisoners of war (POWs) who had been conscripted into the Yugoslav army were released by a German, Italian and Hungarian Armies.  The Slav-speakers in the part of Greek Macedonia occupied by the Bulgarian Army also greeted it as liberation.

Before the German invasion in the Soviet Union, there had not been any resistance in Vardar Banovina. At the start of World War II, the Comintern supported a policy of non-intervention, arguing that the war was an imperialist war between various national ruling classes, but when the Soviet Union itself was invaded on 22 June 1941, the Comintern changed its position. The German attack on the Soviet Union sparked the rage of the Communists in Bulgaria. The same day the BCP spread a brochure among the people urging "To hinder by all means the usage of Bulgarian land and soldiers for the criminal purposes of German fascism". Two days later, on 24 June, the BCP called for an armed resistance against the Wehrmacht and the Bogdan Filov government. After that, and when already months ago Yugoslavia was annexed by Axis Powers, Macedonian Communist partisans, which included Macedonians, Aromanians, Serbs, Albanians, Jews and Bulgarians had begun organizing their resistance. The First Skopje Partisan Detachment was founded and had been attacked Axis soldiers on 8 September 1941 in Bogomila, near Skopje. The revolt on 11 October 1941 by the Prilep Partisan Detachment is considered to be the symbolic beginning of the resistance. Armed insurgents from the Prilep Partisan Detachment attacked Axis occupied zones in the city of Prilep, notably a police station, killing one Bulgarian policeman of local origin, which led to attacks in Kruševo and to the creation of small rebel detachments in other regions of North Macedonia. Partisan detachments were formed also in Greek Macedonia and today's Bulgarian Macedonia under the leadership of Communist Party of Greece and Bulgarian Communist Party.

In April 1942 a map titled "The Danube area" was published in Germany, where the so-called "new annexed territories" of Bulgaria in Vardar and Greek Macedonia and Western Thrace were described as "territories under temporary Bulgarian administration". This was a failure for Sofia's official propaganda, which claimed to have completed the National unification of the Bulgarians and showed the internal contradiction among Italy, Bulgaria and Germany. With the ongoing war, new anti-fascist partisan units were constantly formed and in 1942 a total of nine small partisan detachments were active in Vardar Macedonia and had maintained control of mountainous territories around Prilep, Skopje, Kruševo and Veles. The clash between the Yugoslav and Bulgarian Communists about possession over North Macedonia was not ended. While the Bulgarian Communists avoided organizing mass armed uprising against the Bulgarian authorities, the Yugoslav Communists insisted that no liberation could be achieved without an armed revolt. With the help of the Comintern and of Joseph Stalin himself a decision was taken and the Macedonian Communists were attached to CPY. Because of the unwillingness of local Communists for earnest struggle against the Bulgarian Army, the Supreme Staff of CPY took measurements for strengthening of the campaign.

Otherwise the policy of minimal resistance changed towards 1943 with the arrival of the Montenegrin Svetozar Vukmanović-Tempo, who began to organize an energetic struggle against the Bulgarian occupants. Tempo served on the Supreme Staff of CPY and became Josip Broz Tito's personal representative in the Vardar Banovina.

Meanwhile, the Bulgarian government was responsible for the round-up and deportation of over 7,000 Jews in Skopje and Bitola. It refused to deport the Jews from Bulgarian proper but later under German pressure those Jews from the new annexed territories, without a Bulgarian citizenship were deported, as these from Vardar Macedonia and Western Thrace. The Bulgarian authorities created a special Gendarmerie forces which received almost unlimited power to pursue the Communist partisans on the whole territory of the kingdom. The gendarmes became notorious for carrying out atrocities against captured partisans and their supporters. Harsh rule by the occupying forces and a number of Allied victories indicated that the Axis might lose the war and that encouraged more Macedonians to support the communist Partisan resistance movement of Josip Broz Tito.

Many former IMRO members assisted the Bulgarian authorities in fighting Tempo's partisans. With the help of Bulgarian government and former IMRO members, several pro-Bulgarian and anti-Greek detachments – Uhrana were organized in occupied Greek Macedonia in 1943. These were led by Bulgarian officers originally from Greek Macedonia and served for protection of the local population in the zone under German and Italian control. After the capitulation of Fascist Italy in September 1943, the Italian zone in Macedonia was taken over by the Germans. Uhrana was supported from Ivan Mihailov. It was apparent that Mihailov had broader plans which envisaged the creation of a Macedonian state under a German control. He was follower of the idea about a United Macedonian state with prevailing Bulgarian element. It was also anticipated that the IMRO volunteers would form the core of the armed forces of a future Independent Macedonia in addition to providing administration and education in the Florina, Kastoria and Edessa districts.

Then in the resistance movement in Vardar Macedonia were clearly visible two political tendencies. The first one was represented by Tempo and the newly established Macedonian Communist Party, gave priority to battling against any form of manifest or latent pro-Bulgarian sentiment and to bringing the region into the new projected Communist Yugoslav Federation. Veterans of the pro-Bulgarian IMRO and IMRO (United) who had accepted the solution of the Macedonian question as an ethnic preference, now regarded the main objective as being the unification of Macedonia into a single state, whose postwar future was to involve not necessarily inclusion in a Yugoslav federation. They foresaw in it a new form of Serbian dominance over North Macedonia, and prefer rather membership of a Balkan federation or else independence. These two tendencies would have struck in the next few years. In Spring of 1944 the Macedonian National Liberation Army launched an operation called "The Spring Offensive" engaging German and Bulgarian Armies, which had over 60,000 military and administrative personnel in the area. In Strumica, approximately 3,800 fighters took part in the formation of military movements of the region; The 4th, 14th and 20th Macedonian Action Brigades, the Strumica Partisan Detachment and the 50th and 51st Macedonian Divisions were formed. Since the formation of an army in 1943, Macedonian Communist partisans were aspiring to create an autonomous government.

On 2 August 1944, on the 41st anniversary of the Ilinden-Preobrazhenie Uprising, the first session of the newly created Anti-Fascist Assembly of the National Liberation of Macedonia (ASNOM) was held at the St. Prohor Pčinjski monastery. А manifesto was written outlining the future plans of ASNOM for an independent Macedonian state and for creation of the Macedonian language as the official language of the Macedonian state. However, a decision was later reached that Vardar Macedonia will become a part of new Communist Yugoslavia. In the summer of 1944, Ohrana constituted some 12,000 fighters and volunteers from Bulgaria. Whole Slavophone villages were armed and developed into the most formidable enemy of the Greek People's Liberation Army (ELAS). At this time Ivan Mihailov arrived in German-occupied Skopje, where the Germans hoped that he could form an Independent State of Macedonia with their support on the base of IMRO and Ohrana. Seeing that the war is lost to Germany and to avoid further bloodshed, he refused.

At this time the new Bulgarian government of Ivan Bagryanov began secret negotiations with the Allies aiming to find separate peace with repudiating any alliance with Nazi Germany and declaring neutrality, ending all anti-Jewish laws and ordering the withdrawal of the Bulgarian troops from Macedonia. Through its Macedonia-born minister of Internal Affairs , the government tried to negotiate with the Macedonian partisans promising that after Bulgarian army withdrawal from Vardar Macedonia its arms would be given up to the partisans. It would be possible by condition that partisans guaranteed the establishment of pro-Bulgarian Macedonian state without the frame of future Yugoslavia. The negotiations failed and on 9 September 1944 the Fatherland Front in Sofia made a coup d'état and deposed the government. After the declaration of war by Bulgaria on Nazi Germany, the withdrawing Bulgarian troops in Macedonia surrounded by German forces, fought their way back to the old borders of Bulgaria. Under the leadership of a new Bulgarian pro-Communist government, three Bulgarian armies, 455,000 strong in total, entered occupied Yugoslavia in late September 1944 and moved from Sofia to Niš and Skopje with the strategic task of blocking the German forces withdrawing from Greece. They operated here in interaction with local partisans. Southern and eastern Serbia and most of Vardar Macedonia were liberated within an end of November. Toward the end of November and during early December, the main Bulgarian forces were assembled in liberated Serbia prior to their return home. The 135,000-strong Bulgarian First Army continued to Hungary, aided by Yugoslav Partisans.

However, the Bulgarian army during the annexation of the region was partially recruited from the local population, which formed as much as 40% of the soldiers in certain battalions. Some official comments of deputies in the Macedonian parliament and of former Premier, Ljubčo Georgievski after 1991 announced the "struggle was civil, but not a liberation war". According to official sources the number of Macedonian communist partisan's victims against the Bulgarian army during World War II was 539 men. Bulgarian historian and director of the Bulgarian National Historical Museum Dr. Bozhidar Dimitrov, in his 2003 book The Ten Lies of Macedonism, has also questioned the extent of resistance of the local population of Vardar Macedonia against the Bulgarian forces and describes the clash as political.

After the end of World War II, the creation of People's Republic of Macedonia and of a new Macedonian language, it started a process of ethnogenesis and distinct national Macedonian identity was formed. The new Yugoslav authorities began a policy of removing of any Bulgarian influence, making Macedonia connecting link for the establishment of new Balkan Federation and creating a distinct Slavic consciousness that would inspire identification with Yugoslavia. After World War II the ruling Bulgarian Communists declared the population in Bulgarian Macedonia as ethnic Macedonian and teachers were brought in from Yugoslavia to teach the locals in the new Macedonian language. The organizations of the IMRO in Bulgaria were completely destroyed. Former IMRO members were hunted by the Communist Militsiya and many of them imprisoned, repressed, exiled or killed. Also internments of disagreeing with this political activities people at the Belene labor camp were organized. Tito and Georgi Dimitrov worked about the project to merge the two Balkan countries Bulgaria and Yugoslavia into a Balkan Federative Republic according to the projects of Balkan Communist Federation. This led to the 1947 cooperation and signing of Bled Agreement. It foresaw unification between Vardar Macedonia and Pirin Macedonia and return of Western Outlands to Bulgaria. They also supported the Greek Communists and especially Slavic-Macedonian National Liberation Front in the Greek Civil War with the idea of unification of Greek Macedonia and Western Thrace to the new state under Communist rule. According this project the bourgeoisie of the ruling nations in the three imperialist states among which Macedonia was partitioned, tried to camouflage its national oppression, denying the national features of the Macedonian people and the existence of the Macedonian nation. The policies resulting from the agreement were reversed after the Tito–Stalin split in June 1948, when Bulgaria, being subordinated to the interests of the Soviet Union took a stance against Yugoslavia. This policy for projection and recognition of regional countries and nations since the 1930s as for example Macedonia, had been the norm in Comintern policies, displaying Soviet resentment of the nation-state in Eastern Europe and of the consequences of Paris Peace Conference. With the 1943 dissolution of Comintern and the subsequent advent of the Cominform in 1948 came Joseph Stalin's dismissal of the previous ideology, and adaptation to the conditions created for Soviet hegemony during the Cold War. The Dimitrov's sudden death in July 1949 was followed by a "Titoists" witchhunt in Bulgaria.

After Greek Communists lost the Greek Civil War, many Slav speakers were expelled from Greece.Genocide of Macedonian Children - "Macedonian tribune" newspaper, Fort Wayhe town, No. 3157 from November 4, 1993.  Although the People's Republic of Bulgaria originally accepted very few refugees, government policy changed and the Bulgarian government actively sought out refugees from Greek Macedonia. It is estimated that approximately 2,500 children were sent to Bulgaria and 3,000 partisans fled there in the closing period of the war. There was a larger flow into Bulgaria of refugees as the Bulgarian Army pulled out of the Drama-Serres region in 1944. A large proportion of Slavic speakers emigrated there. The "Slavic Committee" in Sofia helped to attract refugees that had settled in other parts of the Eastern Bloc. According to a political report in 1962 the number of political emigrants from Greece numbered at 6,529. The policy of communist Bulgaria towards the refugees from Greece was, at least initially, not discriminative with regard to their ethnic origin: Greek- and Slav-speakers were both categorized as Greek political emigrants and received equal treatment by state authorities. However, the end of the 1950s was marked by adecisive turn in the "Macedonistic" policy of Bulgaria, "which did not recognize anymore the existence of a Macedonian ethnicity different from the Bulgarian one". As a result, the trend to a discriminative policy, the refugees from Greece – more targeted at the Slav-speakers and less to "ethnic Greeks" – was given a certain proselytizing aspect. Eventually many of these migrants were assimilated into Bulgarian society.

At the end of the 1950s the Communist Party repealed its previous decision and adopted a position denying the existence of a "Macedonian" nation. The inconsistent Bulgarian policy has thrown most independent observers ever since into a state of confusion as to the real origin of the population in Bulgarian Macedonia. In 1960, the Bulgarian Communist Party voted a special resolution explained "with the fact that almost all of the Macedonians have a clear Bulgarian national consciousness and consider Bulgaria their homeland. As result international relations upon the Sofia–Belgrade line deteriorated, and in fact were broken. This led to a final victory of the anti-Bulgarian and pro-Yugoslav oriented Macedonian political circles and signified a definite decline of the very notion of a south Slavonic federation. In Macedonia the Bulgarophobia increased almost to the level of state ideology.

Bulgaria usually kept the right to declare ethnicity at census, but Bulgarian identity was minimized in the censuses of Yugoslavia and Blagoevgrad Province of Bulgaria. but between 1945 and 1965 forcefully Macedonians Blagoecgra Province 1946 and the 1956 census the population was forced to list as ethnic Macedonians against their will by the communist government in accordance with an agreement with Yugoslavia.

After the Fall of Communism and a brief upsurge of Macedonian nationalism at the beginning of the 1990s, sometimes resulting in clashes between nationalist Internal Macedonian Revolutionary Organization (IMRO) and ethnic Macedonian separatist organization UMO Ilinden-Pirin, the commotion has largely subsided in recent time and the ethnic Macedonian idea has become strongly marginalized. A total of 3,100 people in the Blagoevgrad District declared themselves Macedonian in the 2001 census (0.9% of the population of the region). According to the European Court of Human Rights ethnic Macedonians in Bulgaria have endured violations of human rights by the Bulgarian government.

In Bulgaria today, the Macedonian question has been understood largely as a result of the violation of national integrity, beginning with the revision of the Treaty of San Stefano from 1878. Bulgaria denies the existence of a separate Macedonian identity. The Bulgarian denouncement is based on the strong sense of loss of the territory, history and language which it shared with present-day North Macedonia in the past. After the collapse of the Socialist Federative Republic of Yugoslavia and the consequent independence of the Macedonian state in 1991, Bulgaria continued to question of the legitimacy of Macedonian nationhood, yet at the same time recognised the new state. The Bulgarian government of 1991 promoted this political compromise as a constructive way of living with the national question, rather than suppressing them. Yet none of the fundamental tensions over the Macedonian question have been fully resolved, and the issue remains an important undercurrent in Sofia politics.

 Albania 
The South Slavic minority in Albania is concentrated in two regions, Mala Prespa and Golloborda. In the 1930s the orthodox Slavs living in Albania were regarded as Bulgarians by the local Albanian population. The new Albanian state did not attempt to assimilate this minority or to forcibly change the names of local towns and villages. During the second Balkan Conference in 1932 the Bulgarian and Albanian delegations signed a Protocol about the recognition of the ethnic Bulgarian minority in Albania. After World War II, the creation of People's Republic of Macedonia and the policy of the new communist states about the founding of Balkan Federative Republic changed the situation and an ethnic Macedonian minorityFinally, Albania recognizes a Greek and a Macedonian minority - Partly or Fully Unrecognized National Minorities: Statement to the UN Working Group on Minorities, 7th session, Geneva, 14-18 May 2001 , Greek Helsinki Committee was officially recognized. Schools and radio stations in Macedonian were founded in the area.
Albania has recognised around 5,000 strong Macedonian minority. In Albania are both Bulgarian and Macedonian organizations. Each of them claims that the local Slavic population is either Bulgarian or Macedonian. The population itself, which is predominantly Muslim, has, however, preferred to call itself Albanian in official censuses.

 North Macedonia 

North Macedonia officially celebrates 1991 with regard to the referendum endorsing independence from Yugoslavia, albeit legalizing participation in "future union of the former states of Yugoslavia". The ethnic Macedonians of North Macedonia have demonstrated without any exception a strong and even aggressive at times Macedonian consciousness. Any ties with the Bulgarians have been denounced. During this period it has been claimed by Macedonian scholars that there exist large and oppressed ethnic Macedonian minorities in the region of Macedonia, located in neighboring states. Because of those claims, irredentist proposals are being made calling for the expansion of the borders of Macedonia to encompass the territories allegedly populated with ethnic Macedonians. The population of the neighboring regions is presented as "subdued" to the propaganda of the governments of those neighboring countries, and in need their incorporation into a United Macedonia. By the time Macedonia proclaimed its independence those who continued to look to Bulgaria were very few. Some 3,000–4,000 people that stuck to their Bulgarian identity met great hostility among the authorities and the rest of the population. Occasional trials against "Bulgarophiles" have continued until today.Court for waved Bulgarian flag in Macedonia. The Constitutional Court of Republic of Macedonia banned the organization of the Bulgarians in the Republic of Macedonia-Radko as "promoting racial and religious hate and intolerance". In 2009 the European Court of Human Rights in Strasbourg, condemned Republic of Macedonia because of violations of the European Convention of Human Rights in this case. Nevertheless, during the last few years, rising economic prosperity and the EU membership of Bulgaria has seen around 60,000 Macedonians applying for Bulgarian citizenship; in order to obtain it they must sign a statement declaring they are Bulgarians by origin. Probably the most prominent Macedonian that applied for and was granted Bulgarian citizenship is former Prime Minister Ljubčo Georgievski.Macedonia embroiled in encyclopaedia row . Euractiv, 13 October 2009. An estimated 500 Macedonians receive Bulgarian citizenship every week. This aggregates to about 50,000 Macedonian nationals who have received Bulgarian citizenship in the past 20 years. Bulgarian governments justify this policy because they regard Macedonians as ethnopolitically disoriented Bulgarians.''

See also 
 Macedonia (terminology)
 Macedonia (region)
 Demographic history of North Macedonia
 Macedonia (Greece) Demographic history
 Blagoevgrad Province Demographics

Notes

References

Works cited

Further reading
 Ivo. (1984). The National Question in Yugoslavia. Origins, History, Politics. Cornell University Press: Ithaca/London University Press: Ithaca/London (online version of relevant pages)
 Boué, Ami. (1840). Le Turquie d’Europe. Paris: Arthus Bertrand.
 Brailsford, Henry Noel. (1906). Macedonia: Its Races and Their Future. London: Methuen & Co
 Carnegie Endowment for International Peace. (1914). Report of the International Commission To Inquire into the Causes and Conduct of the Balkan Wars. Washington: The Carnegie Endowment from https://web.archive.org/web/20110927153709/http://vmro.150m.com/en/carnegie/
 
 Gopčević, Spiridon. (1889). Makedonien und Alt-Serbien. Wien: L. W. Seidel & Sohn. - Стара Србија и Македонија, превод: Милан Касумовић. Београд, 1890.
 Jezernik, Bozhidar. Macedonians: Conspicuous By Their Absence
 Misirkov, Krste P. (1903). Za makedonckite raboti. Sofia: Liberalni klub. (In Macedonian and English)
 The Emergence of Macedonian National Thought and the Formation of a National Programme (up to 1878) by Blaže Ristovski
 Kunčov, Vasil. (1900). Makedonija. Etnografija i statistika. Sofia: Državna pečatnica (Кънчов, В. 1900, Македония. Етнография и статистика. София: Държавна печатница).
 Lange-Akhund, Nadine. (1998). The Macedonian Question, 1893–1908 from Western Sources. Boulder, Colo. : New York.
 MacKenzie, Georgena Muir and Irby, I.P. (1971). Travels in the Slavonic Provinces of Turkey in Europe. New York, Arno Press.
 Poulton, Hugh. (1995). Who are the Macedonians? C. Hurst & Co. (Publishers) Ltd., London
 Roudometoff, Victor. (2000). The Macedonian Question: Culture, Historiography, Politics. Boulder, CO: East European Monographs.
 Weigand, Gustav. (1924). ETHNOGRAPHIE VON MAKEDONIEN, Geschichtlich-nationaler, spraechlich-statistischer Teil von Prof. Dr. Gustav Weigand, Leipzig, Friedrich Brandstetter.
 Wilkinson, H.R. (1951). Maps and Politics; a review of the ethnographic cartography of Macedonia, Liverpool University Press.
 Kuhn's Zeitschrift für vergleichende Sprachforschung XXII (1874), Göttingen: Vandenhoeck & Ruprecht

External links

History of Macedonia (region)
Macedonia
Demographics of the Ottoman Empire
Demographics of Bulgaria
Demographics of Greece
Demographics of Albania
Demographics of North Macedonia